Wuzhoulong Motors is a bus and coaches manufacturer in Shenzhen, China. Founded in 2000, it has divisions in Chongqing, Shenyang and Guangdong. Wuzhoulong has the capacity to manufacture up to 30,000 buses annually, with 5,000 employees. The company produces buses with plug-in electric, hybrid and combustion engines.

Models

City Buses
Wuzhoulong Coaster Mini Bus
Wuzhoulong FDG5140 City bus
Wuzhoulong FDG6101CNG City bus
Wuzhoulong FDG6101G City bus
Wuzhoulong FDG6101HEVG City bus
Wuzhoulong FDG6111HEVG City bus (Hybrid)
Wuzhoulong FDG6111NG City bus
Wuzhoulong FDG6113EVG City bus (Electric)
Wuzhoulong FDG6115HEVG City bus (Hybrid)
Wuzhoulong FDG6121G City bus
Wuzhoulong FDG6121GC3 City bus
Wuzhoulong FDG6128A CNG City bus
Wuzhoulong FDG6751EVG City bus (Electric)
Wuzhoulong FDG6801EVG City bus (Electric)
Wuzhoulong FDG6910GC3 City bus
Wuzhoulong FDG6921NG City bus
Wuzhoulong FDG6951G City bus
Wuzhoulong WZL6100EVG City bus (Electric)
Wuzhoulong WZL6100NG4 City bus
Wuzhoulong WZL6100PHEVGEG3 City bus (Electric)
Wuzhoulong WZL6123NG4 City bus
Wuzhoulong WZL6123PHEVGEG4 City bus (Hybrid)
Wuzhoulong WZL6731NGT4 City bus
Wuzhoulong WZL6780NGT4 City bus
Wuzhoulong WZL6848NGT4 City bus
Wuzhoulong WZL6870NG4 City bus

Coaches
Wuzhoulong FDG6110DC3 Coach
Wuzhoulong FDG6110EC3 Coach
Wuzhoulong FDG6116 Coach
Wuzhoulong FDG6128 Coach
Wuzhoulong FDG6128A CNG Coach
Wuzhoulong FDG6701 Coach
Wuzhoulong FDG6803 Coach
Wuzhoulong FDG6810 Coach
Wuzhoulong FDG6810C3-1 Coach
Wuzhoulong FDG6860C3 Coach
Wuzhoulong REAUFDG6128 Coach
Wuzhoulong WZL6110A4 Coach
Wuzhoulong WZL6110NA5 Coach
Wuzhoulong WZL6600AT3 Coach
Wuzhoulong WZL6661AT4 Coach
Wuzhoulong WZL6720AT3 Coach
Wuzhoulong WZL6820A4 Coach
Wuzhoulong WZL6820NA4 Coach
Wuzhoulong WZL6890A4 Coach
Wuzhoulong WZL6781AT4 Coach
Wuzhoulong WZL6781NAT4 Coach
Wuzhoulong WZL6890NA4 Coach

School buses
Wuzhoulong WZL6601AT4-X School bus
Wuzhoulong WZL6661AT4-X School bus
Wuzhoulong WZL6740AT4-X School bus
Wuzhoulong WZL6800AT4-X School bus
Wuzhoulong WZL6930AT4-X School bus
Wuzhoulong WZL6661AT4-X School bus
Wuzhoulong WZL6930AT4-X School bus
Wuzhoulong WZL6990A4 School bus
Wuzhoulong WZL6990AT4-X School bus

Other
Wuzhoulong FDG5105XTJ1 Medical bus
Wuzhoulong FDG5140XTJ1 RV

References

External links
Wuzhoulong website

Battery electric vehicle manufacturers
Bus manufacturers of China
Electric vehicle manufacturers of China
Manufacturing companies based in Shenzhen
Vehicle manufacturing companies established in 2000
Chinese brands